Like Father is a 2018 American dramedy film written and directed by Lauren Miller, in her feature-length directorial debut. The film stars Kristen Bell, Kelsey Grammer, and Seth Rogen, and follows a woman who must bond with her estranged father on a cruise after she is left at the altar. The film was released on August 3, 2018, by Netflix.

Plot 

Rachel (Kristen Bell) is a workaholic young executive New Yorker who takes a work call, right before going down the aisle.  The processional music starts, she finally hangs up,  stashing the phone in her bouquet and starts the walk.

The officiant is her boss, and he shares some personal details about the groom, and then turns to Rachel. Then her phone drops out of the bouquet. The groom realizes she won’t ever really get away from her job and he calls off the wedding.

Then, estranged father Harry (Kelsey Grammer) who Rachel has not seen since she was five years old, is at the wedding and sees it all. He races out and she isn’t far behind.

The next day Rachel tries, and fails, to be a professional back in the office. Sent        home, she soon binge drinks alone, then Harry catches up with her and they resume in a bar. Spending all night drinking, they make the drunken decision to take the pre-booked Caribbean honeymoon cruise together. The morning after, out at sea, the trip seems somewhat less amusing.

The two arrive as strangers, but over the course of a few adventures, a couple of umbrella-clad cocktails and much soul-searching, they return with a renewed appreciation for family and life.

Harry is a deadbeat dad and the trip is his road to redemption. Like Rachel, he had been a workaholic, but through being there for his business partner as family he sacrifices his company to care for him.

We see a glimpse of Rachel’s big client, a couple, hippie organic former New Yorker potato chip makers, now living upstate. An example of people who abandoned the rat race for a more fulfilling life. And Harry and Rachel bond with the three couples assigned to their dinner table on the cruise: one young, one 50-year-anniversary, and one mid-life newlyweds.
 
A breaking point comes when Rachel insists on being on her phone at a gorgeous secluded waterfall. Throwing it into the water, Harry wakes her up to the realization that she’s missing out on life. They team up in two big cruise competitions, winning both a ‘Newlywed Game’ and the cruise finale silly karaoke number.

At first, after the cruise Rachel dives head first into her new role in her advertising company, forgetting any lessons she may have learned. Her breakthrough comes at the very end. She reroutes a trip to meet with their big upstate client for L.A. to help her dad’s move as promised.

Cast 
 Kristen Bell as Rachel Hamilton, Harry's daughter
 Kelsey Grammer as Harry Hamilton, Rachel's father
 Seth Rogen as Jeff, a divorced man with whom Rachel has a one night stand.
 Paul W. Downs as Jim
 Zach Appelman as Steve
 Amber Hodgkiss as Ginny
 Leonard Ouzts as Dan
 Blaire Brooks as Beth
 Anthony Laciura as Leonard
 Mary Looram as Shirley
 Brett Gelman as Frank Lerue
 Lauren Miller as Tired Woman
 Jon Foster as Owen
 Kimiko Glenn as Geena

Production
In July 2017, it was announced that Kristen Bell and Kelsey Grammer would star in Like Father, the directorial debut of Lauren Miller, who also wrote the screenplay. In June 2018, a trailer for the film was released, which revealed that Seth Rogen would co-star. Lauren Miller produced the film with Anders Bard.

Principal photography took place in New York and the Caribbean in August 2017. Some of the film was filmed on Royal Caribbean’s Harmony of the Seas.

Release
Like Father was released on Netflix on August 3, 2018.

Critical response
The site consensus reads, "Like Father unites an alarmingly talented cast for a predictable rom-com that does nothing to counter the negative stereotypes surrounding the genre." On Metacritic, the film has a weighted average score of 52 out of 100, based on reviews from 15 critics, indicating "mixed or average reviews".

References

External links 
 

2018 films
American comedy films
2018 comedy films
English-language Netflix original films
Films scored by Roger Neill
2018 directorial debut films
Films about father–daughter relationships
Films about honeymoon
2010s English-language films
2010s American films